Big Brother 6, also known as Big Brother: Zero Privacy, was the sixth season of the Belgian version of Big Brother aired in the Flemish Region of Belgium on KanaalTwee.

The show started on 7 March 2007 and finished on 4 June 2007 with a total duration of 92 days. The season started with duos. The concept of "Zero privacy" of last season was extended. A lie detector was installed and the lies of housemates were detected. The season was poorly received. Because of dropping ratings, the producers made changes. Halfway through the season, half of the housemates were evicted in a massive eviction and replaced with new housemates. The duo concept was abandoned after the massive eviction. Two actors were added as housemates to spice things up. The date of the live shows was reverted from Thursday to Monday, like the previous season. The accuracy of the lie detector was also criticized. 22 housemates lived in the house this season, including eight duos and two actors.

Diana Ferrante won €81,000. The original prize was €500,000, but every lie that was told in diary room was the prize cut for €1,000. 

285,000 viewers watched the final. There was no call for future housemates and no announcement of a new season. A few weeks later, the producers stated that Big Brother wouldn't be coming back and admitted they made mistakes in creating the concept and casting the housemates of last season.

Concept
This season expanded the concept of "Zero privacy". By having a glasshouse where there were no privacy possible. With the slogan "Zelfs gedachten zijn niet meer vrij" ("Even thinking isn't private anymore"), introduced the lie detector. Unknown by the housemates, a lie detector detected all lies the housemates told. Beginning with a final prize of €500,000, for the winner, every lie that was told in the house, €1,000 from the prize was reduced. A plasma screen in the living area showed reducing money all the time, without the housemates realizing what the screen showed.

The house featured three new rooms. Instead of the baby room from the previous season, there was a shop. There was also a darkroom. The third room was a hidden room for the actors in the house.

Housemates
This season started with duos. Every duo had a connection before Big Brother, except for one duo that was put together by Big Brother. Once the massive exit took place and 6 new housemates entered the Big Brother house, the concept of duos was abandoned.

 Duo 1 - Husband and wife 
 Duo 2 - Sisters  
 Duo 3 - Friends and co-owners pub 
 Duo 4 - Nieces 
 Duo 5 - Adoptive father and son 
 Duo 6 - Ex partners 
 Duo 7 - Duo 1 formed by Big Brother 
 Duo 8 - Duo 2 formed by Big Brother

Weekly summary

Nominations table

Notes
: Housemates nominated in pairs - however, they could nominate individual housemates, not the whole couples. Evelin and Hanne were elected "Big Boss" by their fellow housemates - they, therefore, could not nominate, but could be Nominated. Astrid and Kevin received the most Nominations and faced the public vote; as Big Boss, Evelin had the chance to save a nominee and replace them with someone else, but she chose to leave them as they are.
: In a surprise extra eviction on Day 20, the female housemates had to choose as a group a male housemate to be evicted. They narrowed it down to Dimitri, Mario or Mutz and eventually chose Mutz. On Day 23, in another surprise extra eviction, the housemates had to choose another male housemate to be evicted. Firstly, the female housemates had to choose three male housemates to save. They chose Dimitri, Martin, and Benjamin. Then Dimitri, Martin, and Benjamin had to choose which of the remaining three males, Mario, Nicolas, or Roberto, to evict. Dimitri insisted that his father Mario be saved, and so the choice would be either Nicolas or Roberto. They chose to evict Roberto.
: In a world-first, the housemates were divided into two groups - and the groups faced eviction against one another. On Day 27 Group 1 - consisting of Astrid, Benjamin, Demitiri, Mario and Naimoi were elected together and replaced by six brand new housemates - Dennis, Hedrik, Johan, Nathalie S, Teres and Veronique - of which Johan and Nathalie S were moles working from Big Brother. The quintuple eviction happened after falling ratings and complaints that the current housemates were boring.
: In this round of nominations, the housemates were split into two teams - of the New Housemates and Group 2, the survivors of last week's multiple evictions. Each team had to choose one housemate from the opposing group to face the public vote. The Originals chose Hendrik and the Newbies chose Virginie.
: Johan and Nathalie S are moles and therefore cannot nominate, nor be up for eviction; any nominations they receive do not count - however, the housemates were told that they did face the public vote. Diana and Nicholas and Evelien and Hanne, as the only surviving couples nominated together, the rest of the housemates nominated as individuals. Martin and Veronique were Big Boss this week and could not nominate, but could be nominated.
: John and Nathalie S are moles working for Big Brother and cannot nominate, nor be nominated or evicted. Diana and Nicholas were "Big Boss" and could not nominate, but could be nominated. Evelien and Hanne nominated as a couple of bouts could be nominated individually.
: This week housemates had to nominate three housemates to face the public vote. Dennis was "Big Boss" and therefore could not nominate, but could be nominated. John and Nathalie S are moles and therefore cannot be nominated or evicted. Evelien and Hanne were the last couple left and nominated together.
: John and Nathalie S, the Big Brother Moles, left the house when their specified times came to an end. In this week's nominations, Evelien and Hanne nominated together as the last of the couples. There was no "Big Boss" this week as the Big Boss was Nathalie S, but she left the house before the nominations took place.
: Shortly after Veronique's eviction Martin answered the Hot Phone and won immunity to the final. He therefore could not be nominated or be nominated this week. Martin was "Big Boss" and therefore could not nominate, but could be nominated.
: The final four housemates automatically faced the public vote to win.

External links
 World of Big Brother

References

06
2007 television seasons